The 1917–18 season was the first for the team that would become the Philadelphia Sphas. Playing in the minor-league American Basketball League of Philadelphia, the team was known as Philadelphia YMHA, as they were sponsored by the local branch of the Young Men's Hebrew Association. Game-by-game records not available for this season.

References

Philadelphia Sphas seasons